The Ministry of Education and Research of Moldova is one of the fourteen ministries of the Government of Moldova. Ministry was established on 27 May 1953 in the Soviet Moldova.

In 2017, as part of the government reform in Moldova, the Ministry of Culture was renamed to Ministry of Education, Culture and Research, and absorbed the Ministry of Education, and the Ministry of Youth and Sports, becoming their legal successor.

Ministers

References

Education, Culture and Research
Moldova
Moldova
Moldova